This is a list of Members of Parliament (MPs) elected to the 8th Parliament of Elizabeth I of England in 1593, the 35th year of her reign. The speaker was Edward Coke, the Solicitor-general and Member of Parliament (MP) for Norfolk.

The Parliament met on 18 February 1593 and lasted until 10 April 1593 when it was dissolved.

List of constituencies and members

See also
List of MPs elected to the English parliament in 1597
The Golden Speech

16th-century English parliaments
1593 in England
1593 in politics
1593